Along Came Jones may refer to:
Along Came Jones (film) a 1945 western comedy
"Along Came Jones" (song), a 1959 comedic song
Along Came Jones (album), a 1965 album by Tom Jones